The York Central Market, also known as Central Market York, is a historic public market located at York, Pennsylvania.  It was designed by architect John A. Dempwolf and built in 1888.  It is a large, two-story brick building in the Romanesque Revival style.  It has a hipped roof with steep gable dormers and projecting front pieces. The front facade features two three-story square towers with pyramidal roofs projecting on each side of the main entrance.

It was added to the National Register of Historic Places in 1978.

See also
National Register of Historic Places listings in York County, Pennsylvania

References

External links
Central Market York website

Food markets in the United States
Commercial buildings on the National Register of Historic Places in Pennsylvania
Romanesque Revival architecture in Pennsylvania
Commercial buildings completed in 1888
Buildings and structures in York, Pennsylvania
National Register of Historic Places in York County, Pennsylvania